Armand Lapointe (1 May 1822   – 6 March 1910 ) was a French novelist, journalist and playwright. He also wrote the libretto of the opérette bouffe Mesdames de la Halle by Jacques Offenbach.

Biography 
He was a prolific popular author in the years 1850-1890 and still obviously remembered at the time of his death.

During the Second French Empire, his comedies were given in Paris, at the Théâtre des Variétés and his opéra bouffe was produced at the Théâtre des Bouffes-Parisiens. From 1860, Lapointe was devoted mainly to writing novels.

Works 

1852: La Course à la veuve, folie-vaudeville en 1 act
1853: Les Drames du foyer, with F. de Reiffenberg fils
1853: Les moustaches grises, vaudeville in 1 act, with Achille Bourdois and Émile Colliot
1853: Le mari par régime, comédie en vaudevilles in 1 act, with Bourdois and Colliot
1853: Mélez-vous de vos affaires, vaudeville in 1 act, with Bourdois and Colliot)
1854: Un provincial qui se forme, comédie en vaudeville in 1 act, with Colliot and H. Mareuge, Beck
1854: A la recherche d'un million, comédie en vaudevilles in 1 act, with Colliot and H. Mareuge, Beck
1857: Le Bazar européen, revue-vaudeville in 1 act
1857: Avez-vous besoin d'argent ?, parody of La Question d'argent, with Paul Siraudin and Bourdois
1858: Dalila et Samson, histoire en 5 feuillets, mixed with distincts, with Eugène Grangé
1858: Faust et Framboisy, drame burlesque in 3 acts and 11 tableaux, with Bourdois
1858: Mesdames de la Halle, opéra bouffe in 1 act, music by Jacques Offenbach, with Josef Heinzelmann 
1859: Les deux maniaques, comédie en vaudevilles in 1 act, with Colliot and Adolphe Choler
1859: Les Dames de Coeur-Volant, opéra bouffe in 1 act, with Bourdois
1860: Les Parisiennes. La comtesse Jeanne, 
1860: Voyage à la recherche du bonheur, (in Le Musée des familles, issue 15)
1868: La dernière douairière, (published as a serial)
1870: Les flibustiers du grand monde
1875: La vie parisienne
1876: La chasse aux fantômes
1878: Les déserts africains : aventures extraordinaires d'un homme, d'un singe et d'un éléphant, with Henri de Montaut
1878: Les rivalités : le docteur Jacques Hervey
1879: Bataille d'amoureuses
1880: Reine du faubourg
1881: Reine coquette
1881: L'abandonnée, (published as a serial in Le Petit Parisien in 1877)
1882: Le cousin César, (foreword by Jules Claretie)
1884: Feu Robert-Bey
1884: La princesse : roman parisien
1884: Le roman d'un médecin,
1885: Madame Margaret : histoire parisienne, Plon
1886: L'enjôleuse
1886: Les galères de l'amour
1887: Les Mémoires de Valentin
1888: La fille repentie
1888: Reine de nuit
1889: Les étoiles filantes, roman parisien
1889: Le Don Quichotte de la mer, aventures de terre et de mer
1894: Petite guerre, comédie de salon in 1 act
1896: Les sept hommes rouges 
1901: Le fils du Boër
 Le bonhomme misère, Plon

References 

19th-century French dramatists and playwrights
19th-century French journalists
French male journalists
19th-century French novelists
People from Loire-Atlantique
1822 births
1910 deaths
19th-century French male writers